Michael Elihu Colby (born 29 October 1951) is an American theatre lyricist and musical playwright. He is the author of the book The Algonquin Kid and musicals such as Charlotte Sweet and Tales of Tinseltown.

Early life and education
Michael Colby was born in New York City. From 1946 to 1987, his grandparents, Ben and Mary Bodne, owned the Algonquin Hotel where Colby grew up as a child, observing celebrities such as Ella Fitzgerald, Laurence Olivier, and Tennessee Williams. His upbringing in the Algonquin later inspired Colby to write The Algonquin Kid.

Career
Colby has written many musicals. Charlotte Sweet received three Drama Desk Award nominations, including one for his lyrics. North Atlantic won the Show Business Award. Meester Amerika was chosen for the TRU Musical Theater Reading Series.

Productions
 North Atlantic (1977) – book;  co-lyricist with composer James Fradrich
 Ludlow Ladd (1979) – libretto; with composer Gerald Jay Markoe
 Charlotte Sweet (1982) – libretto; with composer Gerald Jay Markoe
 Mrs. McThing (1984) – book/lyrics; with composer Jack (Jacques) Urbont; based on play by Mary Chase
 Tales of Tinseltown (1985) – book/lyrics; with composer Paul Katz
 Slay It With Music (1989) – book/lyrics; with composer Paul Katz
 Happy Haunting (1992) – libretto; with composer Gerald Jay Markoe
 The Human Heart (1998) – lyrics; with composer Steven Silverstein & bookwriter Pat Hoag Simon
 Delphi or Bust (1998) – book/lyrics; with composer Gerald Jay Markoe
 They Chose Me! (2006) – lyrics/co-book writer; with composer and co-bookwriter Ned Paul Ginsburg
 Meester America [a.k.a. The 1st Family of 2nd Avenue] (2007) – lyrics; with composer Artie Bressler and bookwriter Jennifer Berman
 Dangerous (2017) – co-lyricist/co-bookwriter; with John C. Introcaso
 Boynton Beach Club (2019) – co-lyricist; with composer Ned Paul Ginsberg, bookwriter Susan Seidelman, co-lyricist Cornelia Ravenal; based on film by Susan Seidelman

Personal life
In 1986, Colby married Andrea Lee Loshin.

References

1951 births
Living people
American lyricists
American male dramatists and playwrights
Northwestern University alumni
New York University alumni